All the winning performers & personalities from PMPC Star Awards for Television have more than two categories.

 Luis Manzano (5): "Best Male New TV Personality", "Best Male Showbiz-Oriented Show Host", "Best Talent Search Program Host", "Best Game Show Host" and "Best Male TV Host".
 Boy Abunda (4): "Best Male Showbiz-Oriented Show Host" (Hall of Famer), "Best Celebrity Talk Show Host" (shared), "Best Public Affairs Program Host" and "Best Magazine Show Host".
 Kris Aquino (4): "Best Female Showbiz-Oriented Show Host", "Best Celebrity Talk Show Host" (shared), "Best Game Show Host" and "Best Lifestyle Program Host Toni Gonzaga (4): "Best Female Showbiz-Oriented Show Host", "Best Reality Show Host" (shared), "Best Talent Search Program Host" (shared) and "Best Female TV Host".
 Judy Ann Santos (4): "Best Drama Actress", "Best Reality Show Host", "Best Game Show Host", and "Best Single Performance by an Actress".
 Kim Chiu (5) "Best Female New TV Personality", "Best Drama Actress", Best Single Performance by An Actress" and "Best Talent Search Program Host" (shared), "Best Female TV Host".
 Nora Aunor (3):"Best Female TV Host","Best Drama Actress" and Best Single Performance by an Actress ".
 Vic Sotto (3): "Best Male TV Host", "Best Comedy Actor" and "Best Game Show Host".
 Korina Sanchez (3): "Best Female Newscaster", "Best Celebrity Talk Show Host" (shared) and "Best Magazine Show Host".
 Arjo Atayde (3): "Best Male New TV Personality", "Best Single Performance by an Actor" and "Best Drama Supporting Actor".
 Claudine Barretto (3): "Best New TV Personality", "Best Female TV Host" and "Best Single Performance by an Actress".
 Marian Rivera (3): "Best Female New TV Personality", "Best Drama Actress" and "Best Female TV Host".
 Julius Babao (3): "Best Male Newscaster", "Best Morning Show Host" (shared) and "Best Public Service Program Host".
 Ai-Ai delas Alas (3): "Best Comedy Actress", "Best Game Show Host" (shared) and "Best Single Performance by an Actress".
 Robi Domingo (3): "Best Male New TV Personality", "Best Talent Search Program Host" (shared) and "Best Reality Show Host" (shared).
 Willie Revillame (3): "Best Public Service Program Host", "Best Male TV Host" and "Best Game Show Host".
 Sylvia Sanchez (3): ”Best Single Performance by an Actress ", "Best Drama Actress" and "Best Drama Supporting Actress".
PMPC Star Awards